Chosen Hill School is a large co-educational academy school in the village of Churchdown in Gloucestershire, England, between Cheltenham and Gloucester. It is also a Beacon School. The school was mentioned in 2008 in The Daily Telegraph as being the most over-subscribed school in Gloucestershire. In June 2009, it was recognised by Ofsted as 'outstanding'. The school has a large sixth form, with many students going on to higher education, many Russell Group universities.

In 2009, Chosen Hill School sponsored the Cheltenham Science Festival was visited by Robert Winston.

In 2011, Chosen Hill School became national finalists in the Young Enterprise scheme, the first time a Gloucestershire school has gone through to the London finals in 25 years.

History 
Chosen Hill School opened in September 1959 as a selective grammar technical school. The opening ceremony was in 1960 by Peter Scott, the Gloucestershire naturalist and author. In the school's first year, there were 270 pupils and a staff of 14. Chosen Hill's first headmaster was David Gould. A year later there were 390 children and a staff of 21. By September 1961 there were over 500 pupils with a staff of 26. The school continued to increase by an annual intake of about 125 pupils a year.

In September 1970, the school began the transformation into a 'progressive' comprehensive school. By this time the catchment area stretched as far as Warden Hill, Coombe Glen and Shurdington on the east side of Cheltenham and also included half of Churchdown village. With the move to comprehensive education the children were split into streams, with the top streams entered for O levels and the bottom streams taking CSEs. Courses for the bottom streams included social studies, rural science, photography, printing, home decorating, car maintenance, girls' crafts, boys' cookery and typing. Later, pupils were divided into three streams: top, middle and bottom. One of the school's teachers, E Atkinson, developed a special tape recorder-styled visual aid reading machine to help pupils with reading difficulties. The machine was patented and manufactured by a local Cheltenham firm, and it was claimed that most reading problems were solved within two years.

The purpose-built sixth form block, one of the first in Gloucestershire, opened in September 1972. In 1974, the new upper school block opened which contained a new art room, a commerce room, music rooms and eleven new classrooms, as well as a complete new dining area and kitchens. By this time, the school roll had increased to 1,048 and there were more than 60 staff.

In 1997, the school achieved specialist Technology College status, and in 2002 it was awarded Beacon Status.

In 2008, the school was recognised as an 'Environmentally Friendly and a Healthy School'. It was also mentioned in The Daily Telegraph as being the most over-subscribed school in Gloucestershire.

In 2009, the school sponsored the Cheltenham Science Festival. The school also received a visit from Robert Winston, who gave a talk to a science class about his life as a scientist, Ofsted and all of the science teachers and doctors.

In 2009, Chosen Hill and 14 other schools formed the G15 Partnership in which they agree to share resources and facilities. The school also runs a language education business in Gloucester Docks.

In 2011, the school officially became an academy under the new Conservative-Liberal Democrat school policy. The school is now independently run with state finance. The school operates as Chosen Hill School Limited.

In 2011, Betty Salter, the schools governor, was awarded an MBE by Queen Elizabeth II for her 48-year service to the school.

In 2012, the school received 'satisfactory' in an Ofsted inspection.

In late 2015, the school's headteacher Sue Turner announced her retirement. Kirsten Harrison was appointed as her replacement in January 2016.

Kirsten Harrison left the post in summer 2021 to take up the role of director of education at Gloucestershire County Council. Matt Pauling replaced her in September 2021.

Facilities 
The school has a sports hall which holds four ball courts or one big five-a-side football pitch. The hall was named after former head teacher Alan Winwood. One of the two new sixth form blocks has been completed, and has been named the Gould block or G block after previous head teacher David Gould. It also has a new language block that opened in January 2010.

In 2014, work began on a new block for design and art (DART), replacing original DT rooms with brand new ones for woodwork, art, food technology and textiles.

Houses 
The school has four houses: Carne House, Masefield House, Scott House and Whittle House House events are held every year in order to gain points for each house; these include a house music competition in the autumn, various sports activities throughout the year and an annual sports day during summer.

Renovation work 
In July 2006, Gloucestershire County Council announced that it was providing £1.9 million to Chosen Hill School to replace outdated temporary classrooms with purpose-built facilities. The money was to be spent on a new sixth form block, a refurbishment of the science blocks and a new learning support building. The refurbishment of the sixth form block started on 15 May 2007 and was completed in September. The building was officially opened by David Gould, Chosen Hill's first headteacher, after the building was named the Gould Building. Gould donated £1,100 to the school. The Gould Building is not just used for A Level students, but many classrooms are used for Key Stage 3 and Key Stage 4 students for classes such as science, ICT and business studies.

In 2008, Chosen Hill School was granted multimillion-pound funding for ten new classrooms in lower school, a part of the government's plan to rebuild all of the schools in the UK. In September 2008, the lower tennis courts were revamped and now temporarily house the two history rooms, as the previous site is being worked on. In 2009, the school reception was completely refurbished.

In 2011, plans were revealed to expand the school.

Awards and recognition 
 In March 2005, Chosen Hill school were defeated in the final of the HSBC Under 14s Rugby Tournament at Kingsholm by St Peter's High School in what stretched their unbeaten run in the tournament to eight years in a row.
 On Wednesday 26 March 2008, Chosen Hill School won the HSBC Under 14s Rugby Tournament ending a ten-year undefeated run by St Peter's High School. Over 250 pupils attended the match at Kingsholm, Gloucester. The defending champions Chosen Hill were defeated the following year in the final of the same competition. Chosen Hill is now competing against other schools to win The Daily Mail Cup.
 In 2008, the school won the Year 9 Cheltenham District Football Tournament, to become district winners
 In 2008, the school won the Year 10 Cheltenham District Football Tournament, to become district winners
 In 2008, the school won the Year 9 Cheltenham District Netball Tournament, to become district winners
 In 2011, several sixth form students took part in Young Enterprise, which gives the chance for students to run a business, create a product and sell it. Chosen Hill School won 6 out of the eligible 9 awards (6/12 in total) and won the South West Regionals – the first time a Gloucestershire school has won in 25 years. They then competed nationally at the finals in London. Their product, 'Granny's Cookbook', featured local granny recipes and was retailed at over 12 retailers, including the world-renowned Liberty in London, Waterstones and Rick Stein stores in Cornwall.

Headteachers
 David Gould (1959–1977)
 R G Lacock (1977–1988)
 Alan Winwood (1988–2002)
 Susan Turner (2002–2016)
 Kirsten Harrison (2016–2021)
 Matt Pauling (2021–present)

Notable former pupils
 Phil Greening, England rugby player
 Rod Thomas, Wales international footballer
 Sue Groom, Archdeacon of Wilts since 2016
Jack Lisowski, professional snooker player

References

External links 

Educational institutions established in 1959
1959 establishments in England
Secondary schools in Gloucestershire
Academies in Gloucestershire
People educated at Chosen Hill School